The 2021 AFL season was the 125th season of the Australian Football League (AFL), the highest level senior men's Australian rules football competition in Australia, which was known as the Victorian Football League until 1989. The season featured eighteen clubs, ran from 18 March until 25 September, and comprised a 22-game home-and-away season followed by a finals series featuring the top eight clubs.

The season was played during the second year of the COVID-19 pandemic, and saw disruptions but to a much lesser extent than the 2020 season. Virus outbreaks resulted in restrictions on crowds and the relocation of forty games outside their originally fixtured states, but the season was played without suspension and with only minor disruptions to the scheduled dates of matches.

Impact of COVID-19 pandemic 
The season was played during the second year of the COVID-19 pandemic, with the country's vaccination roll-outs commencing around the beginning of the season. The country had largely settled into a paradigm of most states maintaining zero COVID-19 cases outside of their international travel quarantine systems; and when this was the case, it allowed matches to be played in front of crowds (albeit with reduced capacity) and unhindered interstate travel was permitted without quarantine. However, the different state governments often responded quickly to small numbers or even single virus cases being discovered in the community; this meant border restrictions or quarantine periods were often re-imposed at short notice, impacting interstate travel for matches; and, in some cases, that city- or state-wide lockdowns were imposed within the impacted states, precluding football activities altogether. Short 'snap lockdowns', lasting between three and seven days in a given city, became a common response to the first few cases in the community as governments adopted 'Zero-COVID' policies.

The impact of the pandemic to the season's scheduled fixture was mostly limited to venue changes and matches being played behind closed doors; the dates of some fixtured games were adjusted, but none by more than a week from its original date. Unlike the 2020 season, the league sought to avoid putting clubs into long-term interstate hubs, and players were instead promised that only medium-term interstate trips would occur, with a maximum duration of three weeks before returning home. The completion of the season was assisted by special "sterile corridor" arrangements made with several state governments, allowing clubs to fly in and out of those states from some hot zones without quarantine if the travelling party was subjected to isolation and testing requirements in their home states in the week leading up to the match. In the end, the biggest impact to the fixtured season was that the pre-finals bye week, which had been conventional since 2016, was dropped at less than two weeks' notice, and the first week of finals was brought forward, as a contingency to allow the league to respond to any unforeseen changes to border or societal restrictions during finals; at the time of the announcement, the Grand Final remained scheduled for its original date of Saturday 25 September, and the bye week was ultimately scheduled in the week after the Preliminary Finals and the week before the Grand Final. 

The league saw relatively few impacts through the first half of the season, with only occasional games relocated; but, as more virus cases and outbreaks occurred through winter, the second half of the season was more heavily affected with relocated games. In particular:
Rounds 11 to 14: an outbreak in Victoria resulted in lockdown and border restrictions on Victorian clubs, precluding free entry to any state except New South Wales. Many clubs shifted games to Sydney and remained there between rounds during that period.
Rounds 15 and 16: nationwide outbreaks in all states except Tasmania at one stage locked down all capital cities in those states, and precluded most free interstate travel in the country. All non-Victorian clubs relocated their training bases and most matches to Victoria, with only select matches able to be played interstate.
Round 15 until the end of the season: a long period of restrictions in Sydney saw both clubs based outside New South Wales long term.
All finals were held outside of Victoria and New South Wales due to the league’s preference to play finals before a crowd.
While most matches in the season saw some level of attendance restrictions, there was a steady return to larger crowds compared to the restrictions imposed in 2020. This was reversed in the second half of the season, with a return to matches being played with no spectators in many states.

Rule changes
The following rule changes were made in the 2021 season:
 The maximum number of interchanges allowed was reduced from 90 to 75 per team. Like previous steps taken to reduce interchange numbers, this was designed to alleviate congested play by giving teams less fatigue management.
 The interchange bench was increased from four to five, with the fifth designated a medical substitute allowed to take the field only to replace a player deemed medically unfit to continue. Except with permission from the AFL Medical Officer, a player thus substituted off would be ineligible to play again until at least twelve days later.  To be granted permission to play the injury must not be concussion, which has its own mandatory 12 day rule.
 The distance between man on the mark and the kick-off line at a kick-in was increased from 10m to 15m.
 The duration of each quarter of play was returned to 20 minutes plus time-on, as it had been since 1994. Quarters had been played at a reduced 16 minutes plus time-on in 2020, specifically as a fatigue and injury management strategy to cope with pandemic-related interruptions to the season.

Additionally, umpires were directed to use a more stringent interpretation of existing rules related to the man on the mark: the man on the mark had previously been given freedom to move laterally or make a run towards the mark, provided they did not step over the mark; but now, the player would be directed to 'stand' upon taking up the mark position, and would concede a 50-metre penalty if he left that position; he could also choose not to take up the mark, leaving him free to move provided he remained at least five metres behind the mark. This new interpretation made it more difficult for the man on the mark to influence a subsequent sequence of quick-running play, opening up freer ball movement.

Pre-season

AAMI Community Series 

The pre-season series of games returned as the 2021 AAMI Community Series, with teams playing one game each. The games were stand-alone, with no overall winner of the series. All games were televised live on Fox Footy.

Home and away season 
A full 23-round fixture for the 2021 season was released in December 2020; but dates, times and broadcasters were initially revealed only for the first six rounds, with the league intending to release the remaining dates in four-to-six weeks blocks with at least a month's notice during the season.

Through the below tables, there were many matches played before no crowd or a heavily restricted attendance, all of which were caused by the local COVID-19 conditions at the time of the match. Where the venue for the match was altered due to COVID-19 restrictions, the original venue is noted; in cases where the competing teams had a return match later in the season, the clubs sometimes swapped home games.

Round 1

Round 2

Round 3

Round 4

Round 5

Round 6

Round 7

Round 8

Round 9

Round 10

Round 11

Round 12

Round 13

Round 14

Round 15

Round 16

Round 17 

Report

Round 18

Round 19

Round 20

Round 21 

Report

Round 22

Round 23

Season notes
  won its first nine games of the season, its best unbeaten start to a season since 1956.
  'won' the wooden spoon, their 14th total and their first since 1972. They were only the 8th team in VFL/AFL history to finish last on the ladder after every round of the home-and-away season (and the first since 2008).
  won the minor premiership for the first time since 1964. Melbourne also won the McClelland Trophy for the first time since 1990 for finishing first.
  missed the AFL finals for the first time since 2014.

Win/loss table

Bold – Home game
X – Bye
Opponent for round listed above margin

Ladder

Ladder progression
Numbers highlighted in green indicates the team finished the round inside the top 8.
Numbers highlighted in blue indicates the team finished in first place on the ladder in that round.
Numbers highlighted in red indicates the team finished in last place on the ladder in that round.
Underlined numbers indicates the team did not play during that round, either due to a bye or a postponed game.
Subscript numbers indicate ladder position at round's end.

Positions of teams round by round

Finals series

Week one

Week two

Week three

Week four

Club leadership

Awards

Coleman Medal
Numbers highlighted in blue indicates the player led the Coleman Medal at the end of that round.
Numbers underlined indicates the player did not play in that round.

Player milestones

Best and fairest

Coach changes

References 

 
Australian Football League seasons
A